The Industries of the Future is a 2016 non-fiction book written by Alec Ross, an American technology policy expert and the former Senior Advisor for Innovation to Secretary of State Hillary Clinton during her time as Secretary of State. Ross is also a senior fellow at Columbia University, a former night-shift janitor, and a Baltimore teacher. Ross launched a campaign for the Governor of Maryland in 2017. The book explores the forces that will change the world in robotics, genetics, digital currency, coding and big data.

Overview 
The Industries of the Future by Senior Policy Advisor Alec Ross explores the geopolitical, cultural and generational changes that will be driven by the key industries over the next twenty years. Ross is a Distinguished Visiting Fellow at Johns Hopkins University and was the Senior Advisor for Innovation to Secretary of State Hillary Clinton. During his time as Senior Advisor for Innovation he visited forty-one countries looking at the technological advances. He has been a guest lecturer at a number of institutions including the United Nations, University of Oxford, Harvard Law School, and Stanford Business School. Ross started his career as a teacher through Teach for America and in 2000 he co-founded a technology-focused nonprofit organization called One Economy.

The book explores several industries including robotics, genetics, coding and big data. Ross explores how advances in robotics and life sciences will change the way we live—robots, artificial intelligence and machine learning will have impact on our lives. According to Ross, dramatic advances in life sciences will increase our life expectancy—but not all will benefit from such changes. Ross spends time exploring "Code" and how the codefication of money and also weapons (computer security) will both benefit and potentially disrupt our international economies. Ross also looks at how data will be "the raw material of the information age."

Ross also focuses on globalization and geopolitical economics. He explores how competitiveness and how societies, families and individuals will need to thrive.  Ross gives attention to the importance of women stating that "the states and societies that do the most for women are those that will be best positioned to compete and succeed in the industries of the future." The book also touches on how to prepare children for "success in a world of increasing change and competition."

Ross discusses the shift of robotics from being manual and repetitive to cognitive and non-repetitive. He believes that breakthroughs in mathematical modeling and cloud robotics (machine learning and Artificial Intelligence) make robotics acceptable. In the book Ross describes how other cultures have different reactions to robotics and he uses Japan's use of robotics in elder-care as an example. He also expects that less developed countries may be able to leapfrog technologies in robotics much like they did with cell and mobile technologies.

According to Ross, the last trillion dollar industry was created out of computer code; the next trillion dollar industry will be created out of genome code. In the book Ross describes how genome code is already being used to fix humans from curing cancer to hacking the brain to growing organs. He also describes the difference between the United States investment in genome research with that of China.

Ross then turns to the "code-ification" of money, markets and trust. He describes the transition from cash to mobile and online banking. He also discusses the sharing economy from eBay to AirBnB and then gives an overview of BitCoin and blockchain technology. Ross also focuses on cybersecurity and the weaponization of code with a focus on a move from cold war to "code war." Ross states that he expects the total market size of the cyberindustry to reach $175 billion by the end of 2017.

Development history 
Alec Ross has said that he intended to give a balanced point of view with the book that it is neither a Utopian or Dystopian vision of the future which is why he opened the book with the struggles he witnessed growing up in West Virginia. On writing the book Ross said that he knows his parents would have wanted a book like this in the sixties that would describe what globalization would do and he wished that he had a book like this when he graduated from college that would have explored the Internet and digitization on the economy.

The editors for the book were Jonathan Karp and Jonathan Cox of Simon & Schuster.

Reviews and reception 
The Industries of the Future has received mainly positive reviews from the likes of Forbes, New York Journal of Books, and Financial Times. Forbes contributor Peter Decherney said the book "reads like a portable TED conference at which you've been seated next to the smartest guy in the room." The book was also listed on the Forbes list—16 New Books for Leaders to Begin in 2016. Tara D. Sonenshine in the New York Journal of Books called the book a good place to start "if you want to know how to survive and thrive in the fast-paced world of today and how to anticipate the opportunities  of tomorrow's information age." Sonenshine also called out the book for focusing on women and multiculturalism. An article titled "Is predicting the future futile or necessary?" by Stephen Cave in the Financial Times is more critical, saying that Ross focuses on industries with already considerable coverage and investment but Cave points out that "rarely can the future be predicted by extending current trajectories."

Trends 
The following trends are covered in the book:
 Robotics
 Advanced Life Sciences
 Code-ification of Money
 Cybersecurity
 Big Data

Publication 
 The Industries of the Future, Alec Ross, Simon & Schuster, February 2, 2016, 9781476753652, Hardcover

References 

2016 non-fiction books
Futurology books
Life sciences industry
Robotics lists
Simon & Schuster books
Technology in society